This list is of the Natural Monuments of Japan within the Prefecture of Ehime.

National Natural Monuments
As of 1 April 2021, fourteen Natural Monuments have been designated, including two *Special Natural Monuments; the *Otter has no geographical determination and the Southern Native Limit of the Long-tail iris includes areas of Yamaguchi, Saga, and Miyazaki Prefectures.

Prefectural Natural Monuments
As of 1 March 2021, seventy-seven Natural Monuments have been designated at a prefectural level.

Municipal Natural Monuments
As of 1 May 2020, four hundred and eighteen Natural Monuments have been designated at a municipal level.

See also
 Cultural Properties of Japan
 Parks and gardens in Ehime Prefecture
 List of Places of Scenic Beauty of Japan (Ehime)
 List of Historic Sites of Japan (Ehime)

References

External links
  Cultural Properties in Ehime Prefecture

 Ehime
Ehime Prefecture